Roswitha Stadlober (née Steiner) (born 14 June 1963 in Radstadt, Salzburg) is an Austrian former alpine skier.

Career
She concluded her career at the end of the 1987/1988 season by clinching her second Slalom World Cup title, also winning her last race in Aspen. She is married to Alois Stadlober, a former Austrian cross-country skier and world champion at the 1999 FIS Nordic World Ski Championships. Their son Luis Stadlober and daughter Teresa Stadlober are also competitive cross-country skiers. Roswitha has served as a member of the executive committee of the Austrian Ski Federation since 2011. In October 2021, she became the first female president of the Federation, after having served as senior vice-president.

Achievements
1984 Winter Olympics in Sarajevo:
 fourth place at alpine skiing Slalom
1988 Winter Olympics in Calgary:
 fourth place at alpine skiing Slalom

Alpine skiing World Championship 1982 in Schladming:
 tenth at Giant Slalom
 seventh at Slalom
Alpine skiing World Championship 1987 in Crans-Montana:
 Silver place at Slalom
1984 Austrian Alpine Ski Championships
 first place at Slalom skiing

8 World Cup race victories at Slalom

Two time Slalom World Cup winner 1985/86 and 1987/88 (There are statistics, that she would have shared first title with Erika Hess; she and Erika did gain 110 points, but Roswitha did achieve four victories, therefore she is the only one winner.)

References

External links
 
 

1963 births
Living people
Austrian female alpine skiers
Olympic alpine skiers of Austria
Alpine skiers at the 1984 Winter Olympics
Alpine skiers at the 1988 Winter Olympics
FIS Alpine Ski World Cup champions
Skiing executives
People from Radstadt
Sportspeople from Salzburg (state)
20th-century Austrian women
21st-century Austrian women